John Fotheringham may refer to:
 John Knight Fotheringham, British historian
 John Taylor Fotheringham, Canadian surgeon general